Vann Stuedeman (born September 11, 1972) is currently an assistant coach at Illinois. She is the former head coach of the Mississippi State Lady Bulldogs softball team, which represents Mississippi State University in the Southeastern Conference.  She has led the Lady Bulldogs to NCAA Tournament appearances in seven of her eight years as head coach.

Stuedeman was previously the pitching coach at Alabama, where she helped lead the Crimson Tide to six Women's College World Series appearances and an NCAA Tournament appearance each year.

Coaching career

Mississippi State
On July 16, 2019, it was announced that Vann Stuedeman would not return as head coach.

Illinois
On August 25, 2022, Vann Stuedeman was announced as an assistant coach and pitching coach for the Illinois softball program.

Head coaching record

Personal
Stuedeman is a 1990 graduate of Vestavia Hills High School in Vestavia Hills, Alabama.  She earned a Bachelor of Accounting degree from Huntingdon College in 1994 and a Master's in Elementary Education from the University of West Alabama in 1996.  Both she and here sister,  Lorraine “Les” Stuedeman, played softball at Huntingdon and are members of The Huntingdon College Athletic Hall of Fame.

References

1972 births
Living people
American softball coaches
Illinois Fighting Illini softball coaches
Mississippi State Bulldogs softball coaches
Alabama Crimson Tide softball coaches
Sportspeople from Birmingham, Alabama